The 2016 West Virginia Mountaineers baseball team represents West Virginia University during the 2016 NCAA Division I baseball season. The Mountaineers play their home games at Monongalia County Ballpark as a member of the Big 12 Conference. They are led by head coach Randy Mazey, in his 4th season at West Virginia.

Previous season
In 2015, the Mountaineers finished the season 7th in the Big 12 with a record of 27–27 (9–13 Big 12). WVU qualified for the 2015 Big 12 Conference baseball tournament and were eliminated in the second round. They failed to qualify for the 2015 NCAA Division I baseball tournament.

Personnel

Roster

Coaching staff

Schedule and results

! style="background:#00447C;color:white;"| Regular Season
|- valign="top" 

|- bgcolor="#ffbbbb"
| February 19 || 4:00 pm || || at * ||  || Buccaneer Ballpark • North Charleston, SC || L3–4 || Raynor(1–0) || Donato(0–1) || Hubbard(1) || 240 || 0–1 || –
|- bgcolor="#bbffbb"
| February 20 || 2:00 pm || || at Charleston Southern* ||  || Buccaneer Ballpark • North Charleston, SC || W5–0 || Vance(1–0) || Johnson(0–1) || – || 346 || 1–1 || –
|- bgcolor="#bbffbb"
| February 21 || 1:00 pm || || at Charleston Southern* ||  || Buccaneer Ballpark • North Charleston, SC || W3–0 || Myers(1–0) || Piriz(0–1) || Smith(1) || 350 || 2–1 || –
|- bgcolor="#bbffbb"
| February 26 || 9:00 pm ||  || at * ||  || Earl Wilson Stadium • Paradise, NV || W9–6 || Dotson(1–0) || Bohall(1–1) || – || 1,666 || 3–1 || –
|- bgcolor="#bbffbb"
| February 27 || 5:00 pm ||  || at UNLV* ||  || Earl Wilson Stadium • Paradise, NV || W13–1 || Vance(2–0) || Kremer(0–1) || – || 906 || 4–1 || –
|- bgcolor="#bbffbb"
| February 28 || 4:00 pm ||  || at UNLV* ||  || Earl Wilson Stadium • Paradise, NV || W9–4 || Myers(2–0) || Oakley(0–2) || – || 1,076 || 5–1 || –
|-

|- bgcolor="#ffbbbb"
| March 3 || 11:35 pm || || at * ||  || Les Murakami Stadium • Honolulu, HI || L1–4 || Hornung(2–2) || Donato(0–2) || Culp(2) || 2,392 || 5–2 || –
|- bgcolor="#bbffbb"
| March 4 || 11:35 pm || || at Hawaii* ||  || Les Murakami Stadium • Honolulu, HI || W4–1 || Vance(3–0) || Von Ruden(1–1) || Grove(1) || 2,911 || 6–2 || –
|- bgcolor="#ffbbbb"
| March 5 || 11:35 pm || || at Hawaii* ||  || Les Murakami Stadium • Honolulu, HI || L2–6 || Hatch(1–1) || Myers(2–1) || – || 3,585 || 6–3 || –
|- bgcolor="#bbffbb"
| March 6 || 6:05 pm || || at Hawaii* ||  || Les Murakami Stadium • Honolulu, HI || W9–2 || Dotson(2–0) || Pigg(0–2) || – || 2,775 || 7–3 || –
|- bgcolor="#bbffbb"
| March 11 || 3:00 pm || || * ||  || Monongalia County Ballpark • Granville, WV || W4–3 || Dotson(3–0) || Lamb(1–1) || Smith(1) || 1,135 || 8–3 || –
|- bgcolor="#ffbbbb"
| March 12 || 3:00 pm || || Old Dominion* ||  || Monongalia County Ballpark • Granville, WV || L4–510 || Hartman(2–0) || Grove(0–1) || Maguire(1) || 1,319 || 8–4 || –
|- bgcolor="#bbffbb"
| March 12 || 7:15 pm || || Old Dominion* ||  || Monongalia County Ballpark • Granville, WV || W5–412 || Zarbnisky(1–0) || Hartman(1–1) || – || 1,319 || 9–4 || –
|- bgcolor="#bbffbb"
| March 15 || 3:00 pm || || * ||  || Monongalia County Ballpark • Granville, WV || W6–2 || Campbell(1–0) || Swarmer(0–2) || – || 808 || 10–4 || –
|- bgcolor="#ffbbbb"
| March 18 || 7:30 pm || || at #11 TCU ||  || Lupton Stadium • Fort Worth, TX || L6–10 || Wymer(1–0) || Grove(0–2) || – || 4,379 || 10–5 || 0–1
|- bgcolor="#ffbbbb"
| March 19 || 4:00 pm || || at #11 TCU ||  || Lupton Stadium • Fort Worth, TX || L1–7 || Howard(4–0) || Vance(3–1) || – || 4,364 || 10–6 || 0–2
|- bgcolor="#ffbbbb"
| March 20 || 2:00 pm || || at #11 TCU ||  || Lupton Stadium • Fort Worth, TX || L2–147 || Hill(2–1) || Myers(2–2) || – || 4,190 || 10–7 || 0–3
|- bgcolor="#ffbbbb"
| March 22 || 6:30 pm || || at * ||  || Lubrano Park • University Park, PA || L4–5 || Forsyth(1–1) || Dotson(3–1) || Anderson(5) || 682 || 10–8 || –
|- bgcolor="#bbffbb"
| March 25 || 7:00 pm || ESPN3 || at Kansas ||  || Hoglund Ballpark • Lawrence, KS || W1–0 || Donato(1–2) || Krauth(1–4) || Smith(3) || 900 || 11–8 || 1–3
|- bgcolor="#bbffbb"
| March 26 || 3:00 pm || ESPN3 || at Kansas ||  || Hoglund Ballpark • Lawrence, KS || W11–6 || Dotson(4–1) || Goldsberry(0–3) || Hardy(1) || 826 || 12–8 || 2–3
|- bgcolor="#ffbbbb"
| March 29 || 6:30 pm || || * ||  || Monongalia County Ballpark • Granville, WV || L5–710 || Smith(2–1) || Dotson(4–2) || Remillard(5) || 1,212 || 12–9 || –
|- bgcolor="#ffbbbb"
| March 30 || 3:00 pm || || Canisius* ||  || Monongalia County Ballpark • Granville, WV || L0–9 || Hunt(1–0) || Campbell(1–1) || – || 892 || 12–10 || –
|-

|- bgcolor="#bbffbb"
| April 1 || 6:30 pm || || Oklahoma State ||  || Monongalia County Ballpark • Granville, WV || W5–410 || Smith(1–0) || Battenfield(1–1) || – || 1,818 || 13–10 || 3–3
|- bgcolor="#bbffbb"
| April 2 || 4:00 pm || || Oklahoma State ||  || Monongalia County Ballpark • Granville, WV || W4–3 || Vance(4–1) || Cobb(3–4) || Dotson(1) || 1,467 || 14–10 || 4–3
|- bgcolor="#ffbbbb"
| April 3 || 1:00 pm || || Oklahoma State ||  || Monongalia County Ballpark • Granville, WV || L1–8 || Elliott(3–1) || Myers(2–3) || – || 951 || 14–11 || 4–4
|- align="center" bgcolor="bbfbb"
| April 5 || 6:00 pm || || at * ||  || Appalachian Power Park • Charleston, WV || W5–410 || Smith(2–0) || Murphy(3–2) || – || 1,678 || 15–11 || –
|- bgcolor="#bbffbb"
| April 6 || 6:30 pm || || * ||  || Monongalia County Ballpark • Granville, WV || W5–1 || Campbell(2–1) || Wilson(1–2) || Hardy(2) || 830 || 16–11 || –
|- bgcolor="#ffbbbb"
| April 8 || 6:30 pm || || * ||  || Monongalia County Ballpark • Granville, WV || L3–7 || Gaddis(5–2) || Donato(1–3) || – || 753 || 16–12 || –
|- bgcolor="#ffbbbb"
| April 10 || 11:00 am || || Furman* ||  || Monongalia County Ballpark • Granville, WV || L6–8 || Fondu(2–1) || Smith(2–1) || Mullen(4) || 675 || 16–13 || –
|- bgcolor="#bbffbb"
| April 10 || 3:15 pm || || Furman* ||  || Monongalia County Ballpark • Granville, WV || W8–5 || Myers(3–3) || Quarles(3–3) || Brewer(1) || 675 || 17–13 || –
|- align="center" bgcolor=""
| April 12 || 6:30 pm || || * ||  || Monongalia County Ballpark • Granville, WV ||  ||  ||  ||  ||  ||  || 
|- align="center" bgcolor=""
| April 15 || 6:30 pm || || Kansas State ||  || Monongalia County Ballpark • Granville, WV ||  ||  ||  ||  ||  ||  || 
|- align="center" bgcolor=""
| April 16 || 4:00 pm || || Kansas State ||  || Monongalia County Ballpark • Granville, WV ||  ||  ||  ||  ||  ||  || 
|- align="center" bgcolor=""
| April 17 || 1:00 pm || || Kansas State ||  || Monongalia County Ballpark • Granville, WV ||  ||  ||  ||  ||  ||  || 
|- align="center" bgcolor=""
| April 19 || 6:30 pm || || * ||  || Monongalia County Ballpark • Granville, WV ||  ||  ||  ||  ||  ||  || 
|- align="center" bgcolor=""
| April 22 || 7:00 pm || || at Oklahoma ||  || L. Dale Mitchell Baseball Park • Norman, OK ||  ||  ||  ||  ||  ||  || 
|- align="center" bgcolor=""
| April 23 || 3:00 pm || || at Oklahoma ||  || L. Dale Mitchell Baseball Park • Norman, OK ||  ||  ||  ||  ||  ||  || 
|- align="center" bgcolor=""
| April 24 || 2:00 pm || || at Oklahoma ||  || L. Dale Mitchell Baseball Park • Norman, OK ||  ||  ||  ||  ||  ||  || 
|- align="center" bgcolor=""
| April 26 || 6:30 pm || || Marshall* ||  || Monongalia County Ballpark • Granville, WV ||  ||  ||  ||  ||  ||  || 
|- align="center" bgcolor=""
| April 29 || 6:30 pm || || Baylor ||  || Monongalia County Ballpark • Granville, WV ||  ||  ||  ||  ||  ||  || 
|- align="center" bgcolor=""
| April 30 || 4:00 pm || || Baylor ||  || Monongalia County Ballpark • Granville, WV ||  ||  ||  ||  ||  ||  || 
|-

|- align="center" bgcolor=""
| May 1 || 1:00 pm || || Baylor ||  || Monongalia County Ballpark • Granville, WV ||  ||  ||  ||  ||  ||  || 
|- align="center" bgcolor=""
| May 3 || 6:30 pm || || * ||  || Monongalia County Ballpark • Granville, WV ||  ||  ||  ||  ||  ||  || 
|- align="center" bgcolor=""
| May 6 || 6:30 pm || || Texas ||  || Monongalia County Ballpark • Granville, WV ||  ||  ||  ||  ||  ||  || 
|- align="center" bgcolor=""
| May 7 || 4:00 pm || || Texas ||  || Monongalia County Ballpark • Granville, WV ||  ||  ||  ||  ||  ||  || 
|- align="center" bgcolor=""
| May 8 || 1:00 pm || || Texas ||  || Monongalia County Ballpark • Granville, WV ||  ||  ||  ||  ||  ||  || 
|- align="center" bgcolor=""
| May 10 || 6:30 pm || || * ||  || Monongalia County Ballpark • Granville, WV ||  ||  ||  ||  ||  ||  || 
|- align="center" bgcolor=""
| May 13 || 7:00 pm || || * ||  || Monongalia County Ballpark • Granville, WV ||  ||  ||  ||  ||  ||  || 
|- align="center" bgcolor=""
| May 14 || 4:00 pm || || William & Mary* ||  || Monongalia County Ballpark • Granville, WV ||  ||  ||  ||  ||  ||  || 
|- align="center" bgcolor=""
| May 15 || 1:00 pm || || William & Mary* ||  || Monongalia County Ballpark • Granville, WV ||  ||  ||  ||  ||  ||  || 
|- align="center" bgcolor=""
| May 17 || 6:30 pm || || at Pittsburgh* ||  || Petersen Sports Complex • Pittsburgh, PA ||  ||  ||  ||  ||  ||  || 
|- align="center" bgcolor=""
| May 19 || 7:30 pm || || at Texas Tech ||  || Dan Law Field at Rip Griffin Park • Lubbock, TX ||  ||  ||  ||  ||  ||  || 
|- align="center" bgcolor=""
| May 20 || 3:00 pm || || at Texas Tech ||  || Dan Law Field at Rip Griffin Park • Lubbock, TX ||  ||  ||  ||  ||  ||  || 
|- align="center" bgcolor=""
| May 21 || 2:00 pm || || at Texas Tech ||  || Dan Law Field at Rip Griffin Park • Lubbock, TX ||  ||  ||  ||  ||  ||  || 
|-

|- 
! style="background:#00447C;color:white;"| Post-Season
|-

|- align="center" bgcolor=""
| May 25 || TBD || || TBD ||  || Chickasaw Bricktown Ballpark • Oklahoma City, OK ||  ||  ||  ||  ||  ||  || 
|- align="center" bgcolor=""
| May 26 || TBD || || TBD ||  || Chickasaw Bricktown Ballpark • Oklahoma City, OK ||  ||  ||  ||  ||  ||  || 
|-

| style="font-size:88%" | Legend:       = Win       = Loss      Bold = West Virginia team member
|-
| style="font-size:88%" | All rankings from Collegiate Baseball.

References

West Virginia Mountaineers
West Virginia Mountaineers baseball seasons
West Virgin